Jonathan Dunn McKee (born December 19, 1959, in Seattle, Washington) is an American sailor and Olympic Champion. He competed in the Flying Dutchman class at the 1984 Summer Olympics in Los Angeles and won a gold medal, with William Carl Buchan to become the only American to win the gold medal in the  Flying Dutchman  class during the boats participation in the Olympic games.

McKee competed in the 49er class at the 2000 Summer Olympics in Sydney together with his brother Charles McKee, and they won the bronze medal.

McKee and his brother sailed for OneWorld in the 2003 Louis Vuitton Cup and for Luna Rossa Challenge in the 2007 Louis Vuitton Cup. He sailed the 2008–09 Volvo Ocean Race on Il Mostro.

Tasar Class World Champion
1996 Seattle Yacht Club, Cascade Locks, USA
2007 Cape Panwa Hotel, Phuket, Thailand

References

External links
 
 
 

1959 births
Living people
American male sailors (sport)
Olympic bronze medalists for the United States in sailing
Olympic gold medalists for the United States in sailing
Sailors at the 1984 Summer Olympics – Flying Dutchman
Sailors at the 2000 Summer Olympics – 49er
Yale Bulldogs sailors
49er class world champions
Medalists at the 2000 Summer Olympics
Medalists at the 1984 Summer Olympics
Volvo Ocean Race sailors
Luna Rossa Challenge sailors
2007 America's Cup sailors
2003 America's Cup sailors
World champions in sailing for the United States
Flying Dutchman class world champions